"I Am the Weapon" is a song by Canadian rock band Three Days Grace. It was released on September 27, 2022 as the third single from the band's seventh studio album Explosions. The song peaked at number six on the Billboard Mainstream Rock chart.

Background and composition
"I Am the Weapon" was written by Matt Walst, Brad Walst, Barry Stock, Neil Sanderson and Simon Wilcox while production was handled by Howard Benson. The song is about "the notion of youth being stolen from generations below ours." Lead singer Matt Walst stated, 

The track runs at 119 BPM and is in the key of C minor.

Music video
The music video for "I Am the Weapon" was released on November 8, 2022. The music video contains footage of the group performing live during their "Explosions Tour".

Personnel

Three Days Grace
 Matt Walst – lead vocals, rhythm guitar
 Barry Stock – lead guitar
 Brad Walst – bass guitar
 Neil Sanderson – drums, backing vocals

Production
 Howard Benson – producer
 Simon Wilcox – composer

Charts

Release history

References

2022 songs
2022 singles
Three Days Grace songs
RCA Records singles
Song recordings produced by Howard Benson
Songs written by Barry Stock
Songs written by Neil Sanderson
Songs written by Simon Wilcox